Agapanthia alaiensis is a species of beetle in the family Cerambycidae. It was described by Kratochvíl in 1985.

References

alaiensis
Beetles described in 1985